Verkhnyaya Ivolga (Deede Ivalga) is a rural locality (a selo) in Ivolginsky District, Republic of Buryatia, Russia. The population was 981 as of 2010. There are 19 streets.

Geography 
Verkhnyaya Ivolga is located 7 km northwest of Ivolginsk (the district's administrative centre) by road. Ivolginsk is the nearest rural locality.

References 

Rural localities in Ivolginsky District